Zachary Pearce, sometimes known as Zachariah (8 September 1690 – 29 June 1774), was an English Bishop of Bangor and Bishop of Rochester. He was a controversialist and a notable early critical writer defending John Milton, attacking Richard Bentley's 1732 edition of Paradise Lost the following year.

Life

Pearce was born the son of Thomas or John Pearce, a distiller, in 1690 in the parish of St Giles, High Holborn. He first attended Great Ealing School. and then Westminster School. He graduated BA from Trinity College, Cambridge in 1713/4 and MA in 1717.

He was Fellow of Trinity College, Cambridge (1716–1720)  and chaplain to the Lord Chancellor, Thomas Parker, 1st Earl of Macclesfield.
Parker became his patron, to whom Pearce dedicated an edition of the De oratore of Cicero. He became rector of Stapleford Abbots, Essex (1719–1722) and St Batholemew, Royal Exchange (1720–1724) He was vicar of St Martin-in-the-Fields, London, in 1726. He was then  Dean of Winchester in 1739, Bishop of Bangor in 1748, and Bishop of Rochester in 1756. In 1761 he turned down the position of bishop of London. He was Dean of Westminster (1756–1768).

He was elected a Fellow of the Royal Society in June 1720. Towards the end of Isaac Newton's life, Pearce assisted him on chronology

There is a monument to Pearce in the Church of St Peter and St Paul, Bromley. He had married Mary, daughter of Benjamin Adams, a distiller, of Holborn.

Works

The Miracles of Jesus Vindicated (1729) was written against Thomas Woolston. A Reply to the Letter to Dr. Waterland was against Conyers Middleton, defending Daniel Waterland; Pearce engaged in this controversy as a former student of William Wake.

Other works were:

Cicero, Dialogi tres de oratore (1716)
Longinus, De sublimitate commentarius (1724)
Cicero, De officiis libri tres (1745)

He also published sermons; he preached at the funeral of Sir Hans Sloane.

References

Lives of Dr. Edward Pocock, the Celebrated Orientalist, by Dr. Twells; of Dr. Zachary Pearce, Bishop of Rochester, and of Dr. Thomas Newton, Bishop of Bristol, by Themselves; and of the Rev. Philip Skelton, by Mr. Bundy (1818)
 Royal Society Biography

1690 births
1774 deaths
Alumni of Trinity College, Cambridge
Fellows of Trinity College, Cambridge
Bishops of Bangor
Bishops of Rochester
18th-century Church of England bishops
Deans of Westminster
Deans of Winchester
Fellows of the Royal Society
English sermon writers
18th-century Welsh Anglican bishops
17th-century Anglican theologians
18th-century Anglican theologians